Knock You Down is the second studio album from Swedish rock band Dynazty. It was the first album released from the band since signing a contract with StormVox Records. It reached number 21 on the Swedish Albums Chart. The album features a heavy sound with elements of heavy metal.

Track listing

Personnel

Nils Molin - Vocal
Rob Love Magnusson - Guitar
Joel Fox Apelgren - Bass
George Egg - Drums

Charts

References

2011 albums
Dynazty albums